Vijayakumar may refer to:

 Vijayakumar (Tamil actor) (born 1943), Indian actor in Tamil cinema
 Vijayakumar (Malayalam actor), Indian actor in Malayalam cinema
 K. Vijayakumar, Indian Police Service Officer
 Vijayakumar Menon, art critic from Kerala
 K. M. Vijayakumar, Tamil Nadu, South India politician
 K. N. Vijayakumar, Tamil Nadu, South India politician
 K. S. Vijayakumar, Tamil Nadu, South India politician
 M. Vijayakumar (born 1950), Kerala, South India politician
 Manjula Vijayakumar (1953–2013), South Indian actress
 Margi Vijayakumar (born 1960), Kathakali artiste
 Rukmini Vijayakumar (born 1980), Bharatanatyam dancer
 A. Vijayakumar, Indian politician
 G.P. Vijayakumar
 Meenakshi Vijayakumar (born 1964)
 Preetha Vijayakumar (born 1975), Indian actress
 S. R. Vijayakumar (born 1974), Indian politician
 Selladore Vijayakumar (born 1979), cricketer
 Sethu Vijayakumar
 Vanitha Vijayakumar, Indian actress
 C Vijayakumar (born 1967)

See also
Vijay Kumar (disambiguation)